Richard Oribe Lumbreras (born 22 February 1974) is a Spanish Paralympic swimmer born in San Sebastian. He started swimming very soon as a treatment for his congenital mental disability. He is one of the most awarded Spanish athletes of all time.

Personal 
Oribe has cerebral palsy.

Swimming 
In 2007, he competed at the IDM German Open.

Paralympics 
He won a silver medal in the 100 metres freestyle — S4 event at the 2008 Paralympics,
and at the 2012 Paralympics won a silver medal in the same event and a bronze in the 200 metres freestyle — S4.

Achievements

References

Swimmers from the Basque Country (autonomous community)
Swimmers at the 2012 Summer Paralympics
Swimmers at the 2008 Summer Paralympics
Swimmers at the 2004 Summer Paralympics
Swimmers at the 2000 Summer Paralympics
Swimmers at the 1996 Summer Paralympics
Swimmers at the 1992 Summer Paralympics
Paralympic swimmers of Spain
1974 births
Sportspeople from San Sebastián
Living people
Medalists at the 2000 Summer Paralympics
Medalists at the 2004 Summer Paralympics
Medalists at the 2008 Summer Paralympics
Medalists at the 2012 Summer Paralympics
Paralympic gold medalists for Spain
Paralympic silver medalists for Spain
Paralympic bronze medalists for Spain
S4-classified Paralympic swimmers
Paralympic medalists in swimming
Medalists at the World Para Swimming Championships